Rugby League Live is a sports game based on Rugby league. It was released in Australia on September 2, New Zealand on August 27, and United Kingdom and France on November 5, 2010 for PlayStation 3 and Xbox 360. The Microsoft Windows port of game was released in February 2011.

Version 5 was rumored to be released in March, 2020, however this appears to have been delayed.

Development
The title was developed by Australian company Big Ant Studios and published in Australia by Tru Blu Entertainment. Developers of the preceding title Sidhe Interactive stated on their online forum that they supported the new developers by providing commentary, stadium and motion capture data (which may or may not have been used) as well as QA testing.
 As with all preceding home console titles, former New Zealand Warrior captain Steve Price & St Helens R.F.C. Scrum-Half Kyle Eastmond feature on the covers, depending on which country the game is bought.

Features
Key features of this installment include:

Over 40 licensed teams from the NRL, Super League, State of Origin, City v Country, and World Cup.
Four-player multiplayer and online head-to-head or co-op play.
Over 30 realistic Stadiums modelled from real-life counterparts.
"Bone crunching" tackles and impact camera replays.
Clothing and environment degrade realistically.
Replay mode with multiple angles and commentary by NRL commentator Andrew Voss.
Custom player, team and competition creation.

Reception
IGN gave it a 5/10 
GameSpot gave it a 4/10.

See also

Rugby League (video game series)

References

External links

2010 video games
Games for Windows certified games
PlayStation 3 games
Rugby league video games
Windows games
Xbox 360 games
Video games developed in Australia
Video games set in Australia
Video games set in England
Video games set in France
Video games set in New Zealand
Video games set in Wales
Multiplayer and single-player video games
PhyreEngine games
Big Ant Studios games
Tru Blu Entertainment games